Magericyon is an extinct genus of Amphicyonid ("bear-dog") that lived during the Miocene 10-9 Ma (Vallesian Age) in what is now Spain.

Description 
The appearance of this animal was vaguely similar to that of a particularly robust, large felid, but the skull resembles that of a canid or an ursid, like that of many amphicyonids. Unlike most other amphicyonids, Magericyon had teeth associated with those of a hypercarnivore, with laterally flattened canines, the third premolar having a single root, the absence of second premolars and a metaconid on its lower molars, with a reduction in the second upper molar. The scapula and the front leg showed primitive features such as an acromion in the shoulder with a reduced caudoventral projection and post scapular pit.

Classification  
Magericyon was described for the first time in 2008, based on fossils found in Cerro de los Batallones in Spain. The type species is Magericyon anceps, but a second species has also been attributed to the genus as M. castellanus, described in 1981 and initially attributed to the genus Amphicyon. Magericyon is part of the family of amphicyonidae, a group of very common carnivores ranging from the Eocene to the Miocene, and which occupied many different ecological niches. Magericyon is the last amphicyonid known from Western Europe, but its features are mixed; on one hand the teeth were very specialized, while on the other, front limb and morphology of the scapula was more primitive. Evidence also indicates that Magericyon was closely related to Amphicyon.

Paleobiology  
Magericyon occupied a different ecological niche than other amphicyonids, such as the larger Amphicyon and Ysengrinia (which had lifestyles more akin to bears) or Daphoenodon and Temnocyon of North America, which were more capable runners. Magericyon probably lived in a similar manner to that of modern felines, being an ambush hunter of large prey. Studies by Gemo Siliceo et al also revealed that Magericyon had powerful jaw and neck muscles that helped to stabilize its head and jaws during a bite. The amphicyonid was particularly adept at side-to-side  movements and rotations of the head. This feature allowed Magericyon to swiftly and efficiently process the meat on a carcass, allowing the bear-dog to devour sufficient amounts of flesh before scavengers arrived to steal the predator's hard-earned meal.

Paleoecology 
As a carnivore at Cerro de los Battalones, Magericyon shared the apex predator position with two saber-toothed cat species, the leopard-sized Promegantereon ogygia and the tiger-sized Machairodus aphanistus. Evidence indicates that the large carnivores may have co-existed using niche partitioning. A carbon-13 bone analysis matched isotope profiles in prey species with their predators, showing both cats hunted prey that typically live in closed woodland habitats, such as pigs (Microstonyx) and perhaps occasionally young of the gomphotheriid mastodon Tetralophodon. Magericyon ate medium-sized prey that live in more open habitats, with the antelope Austroportax being an important food source and hipparionine horses also present in the diet. Because the site attracted all three species as a predator trap, Magericyon must also have taken carrion or injured animals of various kinds, though its teeth show it was specialized as a hypercarnivore without the bone-cracking adaptations of many other bear-dogs. Magericyon may have competed at times with large omnivorous bears such as Agriotherium and Indarctos, but these genera focused more on vegetable food. As well as Austroportax and Hippotherium, its prey could have included young of the hornless rhinoceros Aceratherium and possibly the calves of the large silvatherid giraffes and boselaphine antelopes. Since its choice of prey suggests life in open country, but its legs were not designed for speed, Magericyon probably would have wasted no time in stealing a meal from any of the smaller carnivores in the region or in scavenging when the opportunity presented itself.

References 

Bear dogs
Miocene bear dogs
Miocene mammals of Europe
Fossil taxa described in 2008
Prehistoric carnivoran genera